Stepan is a Ukrainian striped cat that gained worldwide popularity on social media for its calm nature and jaded posture, making it Ukraine's most popular cat. He has more than one and a half million followers on Twitter and Instagram. Since 2019, Stepan also has an account on the TikTok network.

Stepan was born in 2008 in Kharkiv. Stepan's owner Anna found him when he was little. He has since lived with her in a high-rise apartment building in Saltivka, Kharkiv. In 2020, during the quarantine period, Anna recorded the first video with her cat and it received several million views. Since then, Anna has been posting new photos and taking pictures of the cat almost every day, always coming up with new images for Stepan.

According to The Moscow Times' YouTube channel, by July 2021, the cat's fame had crossed the country's borders, with Stepan "capturing the heart" of the Russian Internet.

In November 2021, Britney Spears drew attention to the cat in her post. The publication had more than 1.1 million likes and almost nine thousand comments. Soon after, the Italian fashion house Valentino published an ad for one of its handbags, featuring the cat Stepan.

On February 24, 2022, Anna and Stepan were surprised by the Russian invasion of Ukraine, during which violent bombings are being carried out in Kharkiv, with the destruction of part of the city, including residential neighborhoods, causing dozens of deaths and injuries. After the invasion began, Stepan's social media accounts confirmed that both the cat and its owner survived the bombings, finding themselves in a shelter. Stepan's photos have been accompanied by photos of the destruction caused by Russian forces, and messages calling for an end to the invasion and a return to peace. After Stepan and his family escaped to Poland, the World Influencers and Bloggers Association helped them find a safe house in France.

In August 2022, Anna adopted a kitten, Stephania; she is a tabby and looks a lot like Stepan. In November of that year, Stepan was appointed as an 'ambassador' by the Ministry of Culture and Information Policy as part of their 'Save Ukrainian Culture' campaign.

See also
 List of individual cats

References 

Individual cats
Internet memes about cats
2008 animal births
Culture in Kharkiv
Ambassadors of Ukraine
Internet memes introduced in 2020
Individual animals in Ukraine